Hangjin Road is a station on Line 6 of the Shanghai Metro. It began operation on December 29, 2007.

The station is located along Hangjin Road within the Waigaoqiao Free Trade Zone, Pudong.

References

Railway stations in Shanghai
Line 6, Shanghai Metro
Railway stations in China opened in 2007
Shanghai Metro stations in Pudong